S. R. Thompson House is a historic home at New Wilmington, Lawrence County, Pennsylvania.  It was built in 1884, and is a three-story, Queen Anne style dwelling with a steep hipped roof and projecting gables.  It has irregular massing, multiple porches, five types of wood siding, and stick style decoration.  The house has been owned by Westminster College since 1945, and used for administrative offices and a women's residence.

It was added to the National Register of Historic Places in 1985.

References

Houses on the National Register of Historic Places in Pennsylvania
Queen Anne architecture in Pennsylvania
Houses completed in 1884
Houses in Lawrence County, Pennsylvania
National Register of Historic Places in Lawrence County, Pennsylvania